Hesham Issawi is an Egyptian American writer and director. He is best known for his work on the films AmericanEast and Cairo Exit.

Life and career

Hesham was born in Egypt, moved to the United States in 1990. He attended film school, Columbia College Chicago and Graduated in 1996. He began his career working in local TV station as an editor and in the documentary world before directing a few short subjects of his own. He wrote and directed the 2004 short film, The Interrogation, won best creative short film in New York Film Festival and best music score in California Film Festival. In 2005, he co-wrote and directed the short film, T for Terrorist, won best short film in both Boston and San Francisco Film Festivals.

Hesham's debut feature film, AmericanEast, about the plight of Middle Eastern people in America post 9/11, starring Sayed Badreya, Tony Shalhoub and Sarah Shahi.The movie was screened in Dubai International Film Festival and won best picture in Madrid Film Festival, 2008.

Hesham lives between Cairo and Los Angeles since 2010. Believing in Independent cinema, he decided to make Cairo Exit in his homeland. The movie was shot in Cairo with no permits due to the censorship rejecting the script. The film was screened at Dubai International Film Festival, Tribeca Film Festival and many other festivals. The film won one future prize at the Filmfest München. The film  won prizes in Filmfest München and EuropeanIndependent film festival.

In 2015, he finished his latest film, the Price,  screened at the Cairo International Film Festival and was released in Egyptian Theater later.

Filmography

As Editor
 2003 - The Mole
 2003 - Saving Egyptian Film Classics
 2004 - The Interrogation
 2005 - T for Terrorist
 2005 - Voices of Iraq
 2006 - Things You Don't Tell...

References

External links
 

Living people
Egyptian film directors
Year of birth missing (living people)